Dustin Byfuglien (born March 27, 1985) is an American former professional ice hockey player. He previously played for the Chicago Blackhawks, Atlanta Thrashers and Winnipeg Jets. Drafted as a defenseman, he has played both forward and defense in his career, although he has generally played defense in recent years. Byfuglien helped Chicago win the Stanley Cup in 2010. Byfuglien is the first black American-born player to win the Stanley Cup.

Early life
Byfuglien was born in Minneapolis, Minnesota, to Cheryl Byfuglien and Rick Spencer. His mother is of Norwegian and Swedish descent, and his father is African-American. Cheryl moved to Roseau, Minnesota, with Dustin to be closer to her family while Rick stayed in Minneapolis to continue college; the two never wed. In Roseau, Byfuglien was exposed to the game of hockey where he found an instant love for the sport, which soon turned into a calling. Byfuglien's stepfather, Dale Smedsmo, played four games in the NHL with the Toronto Maple Leafs in 1972, and 110 games in the World Hockey Association (WHA). Rick Spencer played college football for the St. Cloud State Huskies.

Due to being academically ineligible under Minnesota State High School League rules to play at Roseau High School, Byfuglien first moved to Warrenville, Illinois, a suburb of Chicago, to play AAA under-18 hockey for the Chicago Mission then moved to Canada to play major junior hockey.

Playing career

Chicago Blackhawks (2005–2010)

Byfuglien played major junior hockey for both the Brandon Wheat Kings and Prince George Cougars of the Western Hockey League (WHL). Byfuglien was drafted by the Chicago Blackhawks in 2003. Originally a defenseman at the start of the 2007–08 season, he was moved to a right wing position to give the team a larger body near the net.

He spent parts of his first two seasons with the Blackhawks' minor league team at the time, the Norfolk Admirals, and the Blackhawks. He excelled in his third professional season, becoming the first Rockford IceHogs player to earn the American Hockey League's Player of the Week award, when he scored one goal and had five assists in four games. Byfuglien had seven points in eight games with Rockford before earning a recall on November 3, 2007, to the Chicago Blackhawks and never returned to the IceHogs.

He had a goal in his first shift with the Blackhawks in the 2007–08 season on November 3 against the St. Louis Blues and recorded his first career hat-trick against the Phoenix Coyotes on November 30. He finished tied for fifth on the team with 19 goals and 36 points in his third season with the team, all while making a transition to forward throughout the campaign. He played a major role in the Blackhawks' Stanley Cup winning season in 2010, scoring 11 goals with five assists in the playoffs, including three goals in the Finals.

Atlanta Thrashers / Winnipeg Jets (2010–2019)
On June 24, 2010, Byfuglien was traded by Chicago, along with Brent Sopel, Ben Eager and Akim Aliu, to the Atlanta Thrashers for the New Jersey Devils' first (Kevin Hayes) and second round pick in the 2010 NHL Entry Draft, Marty Reasoner, Joey Crabb and Jeremy Morin. The Thrashers moved Byfuglien back to his natural position of defense, although he had experience as a first-line and second-line winger with the Blackhawks, including the Blackhawks' run to the Stanley Cup in 2010. He became an alternate captain for the Thrashers after a few months into the 2010 season. Byfuglien was selected to his first All-Star Game, along with teammate Tobias Enström. In the 2011 All-Star Game's Skill Competition, his slap shot was clocked at 102.5 mph. A month later, on February 15, 2011, the Thrashers signed Byfuglien to a five-year, $26 million contract extension. He scored 12 goals along with 41 assists during the 2011–12 season that saw the Thrashers move to Winnipeg. Byfuglien appeared in 66 games for the Jets that season and was again invited to the NHL All-Star Game.

Prior to the 2013–14 season, Byfuglien admitted he changed his fitness regime to work more on stickhandling and puck movement. That season, Byfuglien recorded a career high 56 points.

After being moved back to his natural position, Byfuglien recorded 12 goals and 35 points in 48 games. As a result, he was invited to the 2015 NHL All-Star Game as the Jets sole representative. On April 2, 2015, Byfuglien was suspended four games for cross-checking New York Rangers forward J. T. Miller in the head during a March 31 game.

His All-Star streak continued into the following season, as he was invited to his fourth All-Star game. At the time of his selection, Byfuglien has amassed nine goals and 23 points through 40 games. On February 8, 2016, Byfuglien signed a five-year, $38 million contract extension with the Jets to remain with the team through the 2020–21 season.

On October 27, 2018, Byfuglien recorded his 500th NHL point in a 2–1 win over the Detroit Red Wings, becoming the 14th player drafted in the eighth round or later to hit 500 points. He suffered a lower-body injury in a 3–1 loss to the Minnesota Wild in December 2018 and was expected to miss at least 10 games. Byfuglien eventually returned in February only to be re-injured again. Despite this setback, the Jets qualified for the 2019 Stanley Cup playoffs, where he averaged over 25 minutes per game and recorded 8 points in 6 games.

On September 13, 2019, he was granted an indefinite personal leave of absence by the Winnipeg Jets. However, he was later suspended by the Jets for not returning to training camp, though later reports indicated this was for salary cap relief. He underwent surgery for a high ankle sprain in late October, 2019, without direct involvement of the team.

On February 24, 2020, the Jets announced that Byfuglien would not return for the remainder of the season. On April 17, the Jets and Byfuglien mutually agreed to a contract termination.

Personal life 
Byfuglien is an avid fisherman, and competed in the 2011 Fort Frances Canadian Bass Championship on Rainy Lake.  On August 31, 2011, Byfuglien was arrested on Lake Minnetonka and booked on suspicion of boating while intoxicated. Byfuglien pleaded guilty, and was sentenced to two days of community service on July 23, 2012.

Byfuglien and his wife, Emily, have three children. All of the couple's children were born in Winnipeg.

Career statistics

Regular season and playoffs

International

Awards and honors

* injury prevented attendance

See also
 List of family relations in the NHL

References

External links

 
 Hockey's Future prospect profile
 A long road from Roseau to success
 Before Hawks star hit it big, he got his start in DuPage

1985 births
African-American ice hockey players
American men's ice hockey defensemen
American men's ice hockey right wingers
American people of Norwegian descent
American people of Swedish descent
Atlanta Thrashers players
Brandon Wheat Kings players
Chicago Blackhawks draft picks
Chicago Blackhawks players
Ice hockey people from Minneapolis
Living people
National Hockey League All-Stars
Norfolk Admirals players
Prince George Cougars players
Rockford IceHogs (AHL) players
Stanley Cup champions
Winnipeg Jets players
21st-century African-American sportspeople
20th-century African-American people